The Sri Lanka women's national cricket team toured the West Indies in April and May 2012. They played the West Indies in three One Day Internationals and five Twenty20 Internationals, losing the ODI series 2–1 and losing the T20I series 3–1.

Squads

WODI Series

1st ODI

2nd ODI

3rd ODI

WT20I Series

1st T20I

2nd T20I

3rd T20I

4th T20I

5th T20I

References

External links
Sri Lanka Women tour of West Indies 2012 from Cricinfo

International cricket competitions in 2012
2012 in women's cricket
Women's international cricket tours of the West Indies
Sri Lanka women's national cricket team tours